Thelma Rene Kent (21 October 1899 – 23 June 1946) was a New Zealand photographer.

Biography
Kent was born in Christchurch, New Zealand on 21 October 1899. She attended Christchurch Technical College.

Kent traveled around New Zealand by car, horseback and foot to find photographic subjects.  She had an affinity for the New Zealand landscape, with a particular interest in the South Island high country.  Around 1937, Kent met the legendary Arawata Bill (William O’Leary).  She took several photographs of him, which have been regularly reproduced.

Her photographs and articles were published in the Auckland Weekly News and the New Zealand Railways Magazine. Her photos were in the British annual Photograms of the Year 1939.

Through experimentation, Kent became adept at microphotography.

Kent never married and died at the age of 46 in Christchurch on 23 June 1946.

Legacy
Her collection of negatives and prints is held by the Alexander Turnbull Library in Wellington.

In 2017, Kent was selected as one of the Royal Society Te Apārangi's "150 women in 150 words", celebrating the contributions of women to knowledge in New Zealand.

References

External links
A photograph of 'Larnach's Castle' taken by Thelma Kent about 1939.

1899 births
1946 deaths
New Zealand photographers
People from Christchurch
New Zealand women photographers
20th-century New Zealand women artists
20th-century women photographers